Tappeh Rash (also known as Kal-e Taktak and Taqtaq) is a village in Sarqaleh Rural District, Ozgoleh District, Salas-e Babajani County, Kermanshah Province, Iran. At the 2006 census, its population was 91, in 20 families.

References 

Populated places in Salas-e Babajani County